Geoffrey Williams is an English singer and songwriter. Five of his singles charted on the UK Singles Chart in the 1990s. In the U.S., "It's Not a Love Thing", from his third album Bare (1992), reached No. 70 on the Billboard Hot 100.

Discography

Albums
Heroes, Spies and Gypsies (1988, Atlantic Records)
Prisoner of Love (1989, Atlantic)
Bare (1992, Giant Records/Reprise Records)
The Drop (1996, Hands On Records)
Move into Soul (2008, Oyster Music)
Yes Is the Answer! (2012, Kobalt Music)

Singles
"I Want You to Stop (Calling Me Up)" (1984, Code Records)
"There's a Need in Me" (1987, Polydor)
"Cinderella" (1988, Polydor), Germany, No. 9
"Lipstick" (1988, Atlantic)
"Prisoner of Love" (1989, Atlantic)
"Blue" (1989, Atlantic)
"It's Not a Love Thing" (1992, EMI, UK; Giant/Reprise, U.S.) — UK, No. 63; U.S., No. 70 
"Summer Breeze" (1992, EMI) — UK, No. 56
"Deliver Me Up" (1992, Giant/Reprise)
"Sex Life" (1995, Hands On) — UK, No. 83
"I Don't Want to Talk About It" (1995, Hands On)
"I Guess I Will Always Love You/Free Your Mind" (1995, Hands On) — UK, No. 91
"I Guess I Will Always Love You" (1996, Hands On) — UK, No. 79
"Drive" (1996, Hands On) — UK, No. 52
"Sex Life" (1997, Hands On) — UK, No. 71
"Somewhere on a Beach" (2005, Oyster Music)

As songwriter
 "Born This Way" (cowritten by Simon Stirling; from Dusty Springfield's Reputation, 1990)
 "I'll Be There" (cowritten by Simon Stirling; from Eternal's Always & Forever, 1993)
 "Rosanna's Little Sister" (cowritten by Chuck Norman; from Color Me Badd's Time and Chance, 1993)
 "Whatever Happens" (cowritten by Gil Cang, Michael Jackson, Jasmine Quay, and Teddy Riley; from Jackson's Invincible, 2001)

Current work
Williams currently teaches at The University of Melbourne.

He still releases music on his Bandcamp page. The most recent releases were The Sidewinder Project, which was a collection of collaborations in 1997/1998 and Cosmic Love EP.

References

Living people
20th-century Black British male singers
1963 births
Atlantic Records artists
Giant Records (Warner) artists
Polydor Records artists
EMI Records artists
Singers from London
English soul singers